John Parkes may refer to:
 John Parkes (bishop), Australian Anglican bishop
 John Parkes (cricketer), English cricketer and British Army officer
 John Gabriel Parkes, managing director & chairman of Lever Brothers

See also
 John Parks (disambiguation)